Mepparamba is a commercial and residential area in Palakkad city of Kerala. It is a place where the Hindus, Muslims and Christians live in harmony for decades.  It is a unique place because unlike the other places of Palakkad district where one religious community is prominent, the members of all the religions are equally distributed.

References

 
Suburbs of Palakkad
Cities and towns in Palakkad district